Nödinge Church is a church in Nödinge-Nol in Västergötland, Sweden, about  north of Gothenburg. The current church was built in 1727, replacing an older Romanesque church from the 12th or 13th century. The church has a fine baroque interior, with ceiling paintings by master painter Alexander Fox added in 1734. The pulpit was added in 1741 by the sculptor Johan Petter Weber. It underwent extensive renovation in 1981-1982.

The church has been used, among other things, for the filming of the 2013 movie The Anderssons Hit the Road.

References

External links

Churches in Västra Götaland County
Churches completed in 1727
18th-century Church of Sweden church buildings
1727 establishments in Sweden
Churches in the Diocese of Gothenburg